Bayan station may refer to:

 Bayan (Airport) station, a metro station on Line 1 of the Hohhot Metro in Saihan District, Hohhot, China
 Bayan railway station, a railway station in Hualong Hui Autonomous County, Haidong, Qinghai, China